The Paul McCartney Band is singer Paul McCartney's longtime band of studio and touring musicians. The core lineup has been steady since 2002: In addition to McCartney, it includes Wix Wickens on keyboards and serving as musical director, Rusty Anderson on guitar, Brian Ray on guitar and bass, and Abe Laboriel Jr. on drums.

History
McCartney has had only two significant incarnations of a backing band since the breakup of Paul McCartney and Wings in 1981. The former band, active from 1989 to 1993 with occasional appearances thereafter, included his wife Linda McCartney on vocals and keyboards, Hamish Stuart on guitar and bass, Wickens on keyboards, and former Pretenders Robbie McIntosh and Blair Cunningham on guitar and drums respectively. Wickens' former collaborator in Edie Brickell & New Bohemians, drummer Chris Whitten, also featured early in this lineup. This lineup played on McCartney's studio albums Flowers in the Dirt and Off the Ground and the live albums Tripping the Live Fantastic, Unplugged (The Official Bootleg), and Paul Is Live.

After Linda McCartney died in 1998, McCartney began to coalesce a new band on his next few albums. Driving Rain featured Anderson and Laboriel. After being recruited one day before McCartney performed "Freedom" at Super Bowl XXXVI, Ray joined the band on Chaos and Creation in the Backyard. Memory Almost Full returned Wickens to the lineup. New and Egypt Station featured all four. Anderson and Laboriel also appeared on one track of McCartney III, an album on which all instruments other than theirs were played by McCartney himself.

McCartney credits the band's familiarity for their continued cohesiveness. He said in 2014, "I trust the guys. They know what I'm going to do, I know what they are going to do. We surprise each other — and even if it's like, 'I didn’t know you were going to do that,' we can all follow it. That's the great thing with a band. And all of us just come to play music. There’s no other thing on the agenda. We just love playing together."

The quintet has also been the backbone of two decades of world tours. They appear on the live albums and DVDs Back in the U.S., Back in the World Live, Paul McCartney in Red Square, The Space Within US, Good Evening New York City, and Live in Los Angeles, the latter with David Arch filling in for Wickens. The lineup returned to the Super Bowl for McCartney's halftime show in 2005. In 2010, they played together at the White House when McCartney received the Gershwin Prize from President Barack Obama.

The current incarnation has been together longer than any of McCartney's other bands, including the Beatles and Wings. McCartney noted in 2014, “A couple of years ago, I kind of looked at them and said: ‘You know what guys? We’re a band. We’re a real band. I think up until then we’d just been thinking: ‘We’re getting together, and playing some songs.’ But we’re a band now — and that elevated our performance, I think. When we realized that, we sort of felt so much better about what we were doing.”

Members

Current lineup
Paul McCartney – lead vocals, bass guitar, rhythm and lead guitars, piano, ukulele, mandolin, drums 
Wix Wickens – keyboards, accordion, rhythm guitar, bass guitar, harmonica, percussion, backing vocals 
Rusty Anderson – lead guitar, backing vocals 
Abe Laboriel Jr. – drums, percussion, backing vocals 
Brian Ray – rhythm and lead guitars, bass guitar, percussion, backing vocals 
In addition, the Hot City Horns (Paul Burton on trombone, Kenji Fenton on saxophone, and Mike Davis on trumpet) have played with McCartney on tours since 2018.

Past lineup
Linda McCartney – vocals, keyboards, autoharp, train whistle, percussion 
Chris Whitten – drums 
Robbie McIntosh – lead guitar, piano, percussion, backing vocals 
Hamish Stuart – guitar, bass guitar, vocals 
Blair Cunningham – drums, percussion, backing vocals

Timeline

References

Musical backing groups
Paul McCartney